The term Edinburgh School describes two schools of cultural thought:

 The Edinburgh School, a group of artists
 The  Edinburgh School, a group of sociologists